The 1959–60 Ohio Bobcats men's basketball team represented Ohio University as a member of the Mid-American Conference in the college basketball season of 1959–60. The team was coached by Jim Snyder and played their home games at the Men's Gymnasium. The Bobcats finished the regular season with a record of 16–6 and won MAC regular season title with a conference record of 10–2. They received a bid to the NCAA tournament. There they defeated Notre Dame before losing to Georgia Tech in the Sweet Sixteen.

Schedule

|-
!colspan=9 style=| Regular Season

|-
!colspan=9 style=| NCAA Tournament

Source:

Statistics

Team Statistics
Final 1959–60 Statistics

Source

Player statistics

Source

References

Ohio Bobcats men's basketball seasons
Ohio
Ohio
Ohio Bobcats men's basketball
Ohio Bobcats men's basketball